Diane Margaret "Deena" Payne (born 29 August 1954) is an English actress and former singer. She is best known for playing Viv Hope in the long-running ITV soap opera Emmerdale.

Life and career
Payne was born in Orpington, Kent. She used to tour with ex-Animals keyboard player Alan Price as a backing singer and she was a member of the novelty girl band Cats U.K., who scored a UK top 30 hit with "Luton Airport" in October 1979. She was also one of the dancers in Rock Follies of '77. Before Emmerdale, Payne had acted in episodes of Tales of Sherwood Forest and The Bill. She has also appeared in Lily Savage's Blankety Blank.

Her Emmerdale character was written out of the series in 2011 after 18 years, dying in her sleep during a fire, as the bosses felt the character had run its course. Since leaving Emmerdale, Deena has returned to the stage, appearing in Calendar Girls and various pantomimes. Most recently, she featured on the television show True Crime as the character Irene. In 2020, she appeared in an episode of the BBC soap opera Doctors as Patricia Taymount.

Awards and nominations

References

External links
 

1954 births
Living people
English soap opera actresses
English television actresses
English women singers
People from Orpington
Actresses from Kent
Musicians from Kent